Seaspray is a small coastal town in Victoria, Australia, in the Gippsland region of the state.

Seaspray's main recreational features and tourism attractions focus around swimming, surfing and other watersports, as well as fishing on the Ninety Mile Beach. There is also fishing in the creek, walks, tennis, picnic and playground facilities, and regular markets. 

Especially in winter, southern right whales may provide onlookers chances to witness them cavorting close to shores.

The town is home to a Surf Life Saving Club and hosts annual Surf Life Saving Carnivals. In 2015 the Seaspray Surf Life Saving Club underwent a $2.6 million rebuild after the previous club rooms had been badly damaged by violent storms in 2007. This first stage of the rebuild included better operational control facilities, a first-aid centre, equipment storage, and a social function area with views across the town and beach. Future stages of the work will include a patrol tower, extensive outside decking to expand the function area, and greater storage facilities.

History
In 1943, 7 people were injured at Seaspray Beach after a wire attached to an RAAF plane failed to retract.

Seaspray hosted an overnight's stay of the Great Victorian Bike Ride on its seventh running in 1990 and again in 2017.

References

Beaches of Victoria (Australia)
Surfing locations in Victoria (Australia)
Towns in Victoria (Australia)
Shire of Wellington